Thomas Houts Creighton (November 29, 1865–November 2, 1942) was an American lawyer, teacher, and politician.

Creighton was born, on a farm, in Wayne County, Illinois and went to the public schools. He went to the Hayward Collegiate Institute in Fairfield, Illinois and then taught school. Creighton practiced law in Fairfield, Illinois. He served in the Illinois House of Representatives in 1893 and 1894. Creighton was a Republican. Creighton died in a hospital in Evansville, Indiana.

Notes

1865 births
1942 deaths
People from Wayne County, Illinois
Educators from Illinois
Illinois lawyers
Republican Party members of the Illinois House of Representatives